Monique is a female given name.

Monique or variation, may also refer to:

 Monique (film), 1970 UK film
 Radio Monique, offshore radio station broadcasting to the Low Countries
 Mount Monique, Antarctica; a mountain
 Sainte-Monique, Quebec (disambiguation), several places in Canada
 San Monique, a fictional location from Live and Let Die James Bond film
 Monique of Cambodia (born 1936) Queen Mother of Cambodia
 Monique Hicks (born 1967) U.S. actress and comedian
 Tiffany Monique (born 1977) U.S. singer

See also

 Saint Monica (Sainte Monique) 4th century Christian saintess
 
 Santa Monica (disambiguation)
 Monica (disambiguation)
 Monika (disambiguation)
 'Nique (disambiguation)